Otholobium saxosum is a small shrublet of up to  high that has been assigned to the Pea family, with branches upright or horizontal at the base with rising tips. It has sessile, clover-like leaves and white, pea-like flowers that grow in triplets in the axils of the upper leaves of new, short side shoots. The species is only known from Garcia's Pass, Western Cape province of South Africa. Flowering occurs in October and November.

Description 
The side branches are slender and covered in straight, soft, spreading or erect hairs and warts. Initially, the leaflets are somewhat softly hairy but these hairs are quickly shed. The leaflets have sunken glands that are more obvious on the upper surface. The side leaflets are smaller, asymmetrical, with the inner margin approximately straight and the outer margin curved. The secondary veins are weakly developed. The tip of the leaflets is pointy or blunt, but the middle vein always extends from the leaf blade into a straight point.

The flowers are crowded on new, short side shoots in triplets in the axils of the upper leaves. The two teeth next to the standard have fused for 1 mm above the rim of the tube. Small, scattered glands are present mostly on the teeth. As in most Faboideae, the corolla is zygomorphic, forms a specialized structure and consists of five free petals. The blade of the wing is adorned with 10-12 ridges and has one lobe or auricle facing the base. The two keel petals not only stick together along their base but also cling to the wing petals with the auricles. At the tip, the ovary extends into a hairless style that strongly widens at the place where it curves upwards about 1.5 mm from its end. The style is topped by a pinhead-shaped stigma. Fruits and seeds were unknown at the time of the description of this species.

Differences with related species 
Otholobium saxosum differs from O. polyphyllum, which is a taller, bushy, upright shrub (not a small, more or less upright or ascending shrublet), with obliquely oblong leaflets (not inverted egg-shaped), pointy oval stipules (not awl-shaped), flowers of 6–7 mm long with an oval standard (not 9–10 mm with an elliptic standard), calyx teeth next to the standard that are fused over two-thirds of their length (not fused for only 1 mm) and an oblong bract subtending each triplet of flowers (not narrowly lance-shaped).
O. bowieanum is the only other species in this genus with white flowers, stalkless, clover-like leaves and asymmetrical side leaflets that also grows on Garcia's Pass and the adjacent mountains. It however differs from Otholobium saxosum in having 8–10 mm wide leaflets (not 4–7 mm wide), that are slightly roughly hairy when young (not slightly softly hairy), a hooked extension of the midvein (not straight), flowers in open inflorescences above the leaves (not hidden between the leaves) and the calyx teeth neighbouring the standard partially fused (not only fused for 1 mm).

Taxonomy 
As far as known, this species was first collected by the famous South African botanist Harry Bolus in 1904. Charles Stirton and A. Muthama Muasya considered it sufficiently different from its relatives, described it in 2017, and called it Otholobium saxosum. The name of the genus Otholobium is a combination of the Greek words ὠθέω (ōthéō) meaning to push and λοβός (lobos) meaning pod, which Stirton selected because its fruit seems to be pushed out of the calyx. The species name saxosum means stony and refers to the rocky terrain where it naturally grows.

Conservation, distribution and ecology 
Otholobium saxosum is considered an endangered species because less than 250 mature specimens can be found at the two locations where it is known to grow. Some habitat of this species has been lost to invasive alien plants and forestry plantations, but the decline has currently halted. It a pyrophytic species that can only be found flowering a few years following a fire.

References 

Otholobium saxosum
Endemic flora of South Africa
Plants described in 2017